Sergio Sorrentino (19 July 1924 – 1 July 2017) was an Italian sailor who competed in the 1956 Summer Olympics and the 1964 Summer Olympics.

References

1924 births
2017 deaths
Olympic sailors of Italy
Italian male sailors (sport)
Sailors at the 1956 Summer Olympics – Dragon
Sailors at the 1964 Summer Olympics – Dragon